Notolepis is a genus of barracudinas.

Species
There are currently two recognized species in this genus:
 Notolepis annulata Post, 1978 (Ringed barracudina)
 Notolepis coatsi Dollo, 1908 (Antarctic jonasfish)

References

Paralepididae